Rui Abreu (23 June 1961 – 31 October 1982) was a Portuguese backstroke and freestyle swimmer. He competed at the 1976 Summer Olympics and the 1980 Summer Olympics.

Abreu was found unresponsive by his room mate and rushed to hospital in Cleveland, Ohio, where he was pronounced dead.

References

External links
 

1961 births
1982 deaths
Portuguese male backstroke swimmers
Portuguese male freestyle swimmers
Olympic swimmers of Portugal
Swimmers at the 1976 Summer Olympics
Swimmers at the 1980 Summer Olympics
20th-century Portuguese people